The Plank is a 30-minute, British slapstick comedy film for television from 1979, which was written and directed by Eric Sykes. This version, which is a remake of the 1967 film The Plank, also written and directed by Sykes, was produced by Thames Television and broadcast on the ITV network.

Although not literally a silent film, it has little spoken dialogue. Instead the film is punctuated by grunts, other vocal noises and sound effects. The soundtrack was composed by Alan Braden, and performed by Alan Braden and his orchestra.

Sveriges Television in Sweden used to show the film several times around Christmas and New Year during the 1980s and 1990s.

Outline
When two builders find that a floorboard is missing, they buy a replacement floorboard and return with it through the streets, causing unexpected chaos.

This was the third version of The Plank; the basic idea had originated in an episode called "Sykes and a Plank", which Eric Sykes had written for his BBC television comedy series, Sykes and a... in 1964. This 1979 television version won the prize at the 1980 Festival Rose d'Or, held in Montreux, Switzerland.

Cast

References

External links

1979 comedy films
1979 films
Films directed by Eric Sykes
Films set in London
1970s English-language films
1970s British films
British comedy television films